The King of Havana is a 2015 Spanish-Dominican drama film directed by Agustí Villaronga which adapts Pedro Juan Gutiérrez's dirty realist novel El rey de La Habana. It stars Maykol David Tortolo, Yordanka Ariosa and Héctor Medina. It is set in the Cuban capital during the Special Period.

Plot 
Set in the Cuban capital during the Special Period, Reynaldo ('Rey'), returns to his old home in the wake of his escape from a juvenile prison, and wanders around Old Havana, meeting with prostitutes Magda and Yunisleidi.

Cast

Production 
A joint Spain-Dominican Republic co-production, the film was produced by Pandora Cinema, Tusitala, AIE El Rey de La Habana and Esencia Films. Filming began on 16 April 2015 in the Dominican Republic and it had already wrapped by 4 May 2015.

Release 
The film screened at the 63rd San Sebastián International Film Festival on 23 September 2015. Distributed by Filmax, it opened in Spanish theatres on 16 October 2015.

Reception 
Guy Lodge of Variety deemed the film to be "an unabashedly torrid urban melodrama that will enrapture or repel viewers — or, quite possibly, both — with its upfront, up-in-your-face excess".

Neil Young of The Hollywood Reporter assessed the film to be "a two-hour immersion in poverty, squalor, sex, violence, prostitution and death", summing up as bottom line: "an extravagantly raunchy wallow in sordid poverty".

Lee Marshall of ScreenDaily considered that the film, guilty of using "shock tactics for effect", "can't help but leave a bad taste in the mouth at the end of its entertainingly sensationalist two-hour ride".

Jordi Costa of El País, wrote about the film's brutal story, in which "the small outbreaks of human warmth" "make the blunt and desperate outcome to have an outright annihilating effect.

Accolades 

|-
| align = "center" | 2015 || 63rd San Sebastián International Film Festival || Silver Shell for Best Actress || Yordanka Ariosa ||  || 
|-
| align = "center" rowspan = "15" | 2016 || rowspan = "12" | 8th Gaudí Awards || colspan = "2" | Best Non-Catalan language Film ||  || rowspan = "12" | 
|-
| Best Director || Agustí Villaronga || 
|-
| Best Screenplay || Agustí Villaronga || 
|-
| Best Production Supervision || Josep Amorós, Carla Jovine || 
|-
| Best Art Direction || Alain Ortiz || 
|-
| Best Editing || Raúl Román || 
|-
| Best Original Score || Joan Valent || 
|-
| Best Cinematography || Josep Maria Civit || 
|-
| Best Costume Design || María Gil, Sonia Segura || 
|-
| Best Sound || Fernando Novillo, Franklin Hernández, Ricard Galceran || 
|-
| Best Visual Effects || Bernat Aragonés, Lluís Rivera || 
|-
| Best Makeup and Hairstyles || Ainhoa Eskisabel || 
|-
| rowspan = "3" | 30th Goya Awards || Best Adapted Screenplay || Agustí Villaronga ||  || rowspan = "3" | 
|-
| Best New Actress || Yordanka Ariosa ||  
|-
| Best Cinematography || Josep Mª Civit || 
|}

See also 
 List of Spanish films of 2015

References

External links 
 The King of Havana at ICAA's Catálogo de Cinespañol

2015 drama films
2015 films
2010s Spanish-language films
Spanish drama films
Dominican Republic drama films
Films set in Havana
Films about prostitution
Films shot in the Dominican Republic
Films set in the 1990s
Films based on Cuban novels
2010s Spanish films
Films directed by Agustí Villaronga